Pristimantis mondolfii is a species of frog in the family Strabomantidae.

It is endemic to Venezuela where it is only known from its type locality, Matamula in Delicias, Táchira, western Venezuela.
Its natural habitat is tropical seasonal (semi-deciduous) forest. It is probably affected by habitat loss caused by coffee plantations.

References

mondolfii
Endemic fauna of Venezuela
Amphibians of Venezuela
Amphibians described in 1984
Taxonomy articles created by Polbot